Cousins for Life is an American comedy television series created by Kevin Kopelow and Heath Seifert that aired on Nickelodeon from November 24, 2018 to June 8, 2019. The series stars Scarlet Spencer, Dallas Dupree Young, Micah Abbey, Ron G, and Ishmel Sahid.

Premise 
When his wife is deployed on a mission across the sea, Clark takes his son Stuart where they move to Portland to live with Clark's uptight brother Lewis and his children Ivy and Leaf. Since moving in together, Stuart and Ivy partake in different activities together while having different misadventures along the way.

Cast

Main 
 Scarlet Spencer as Ivy
 Dallas Dupree Young as Stuart
 Micah Abbey as Leaf
 Ron G as Lewis
 Ishmel Sahid as Clark

Recurring 
 Jolie Hoang-Rappaport as Gemma

Notable guest stars 
 Lizzy Greene as Natalie
 Roman Reigns as Rodney
 Annie LeBlanc as herself
 Savannah May as Marigold
 Daniella Monet as Denise

Production 
The series was green-lit with a 20-episode order on March 8, 2018, and premiered in November 2018. Production began in Los Angeles in summer 2018. Kevin Kopelow and Heath Seifert serve as executive producers. On October 29, 2018, it was announced that a sneak peek of the series would air on November 24, 2018. New episodes of the series resumed on January 5, 2019.

Episodes

Ratings 
 
}}

References

External links 
 

2010s American children's comedy television series
2010s Nickelodeon original programming
2018 American television series debuts
2019 American television series endings
English-language television shows